

Austria

Belarus

Belgium

Bulgaria

Czech Republic

Denmark

Finland

France

Germany

Greece

Hungary

Italy

Netherlands

Norway

Poland

Portugal

Romania

Russia

Spain

Sweden

Switzerland

Turkey

Ukraine

United Kingdom

Notes

Rapid transit in Europe